Events from the year 1900 in Canada.

Incumbents

Crown 
 Monarch – Victoria

Federal government 
 Governor General – Gilbert Elliot-Murray-Kynynmound, 4th Earl of Minto 
 Prime Minister – Wilfrid Laurier
 Chief Justice – Samuel Henry Strong (Ontario)
 Parliament – 8th (until 9 October)

Provincial governments

Lieutenant governors 
Lieutenant Governor of British Columbia – Thomas Robert McInnes (until June 21) then Henri-Gustave Joly de Lotbinière
Lieutenant Governor of Manitoba – James Colebrooke Patterson (until October 10) then Daniel Hunter McMillan
Lieutenant Governor of New Brunswick – Jabez Bunting Snowball 
Lieutenant Governor of Nova Scotia – Malachy Bowes Daly (until July 26) then Alfred Gilpin Jones    
Lieutenant Governor of Ontario – Oliver Mowat 
Lieutenant Governor of Prince Edward Island – Peter Adolphus McIntyre  
Lieutenant Governor of Quebec – Louis-Amable Jetté

Premiers 
Premier of British Columbia – Charles Augustus Semlin (until February 28) then Joseph Martin  (February 28 to June 15) then Edward Gawler Prior  
Premier of Manitoba – Thomas Greenway (until January 10) then Hugh John Macdonald (January 10 to October 29) then Rodmond Roblin  
Premier of New Brunswick – Henry Emmerson (until August 31) then Lemuel John Tweedie
Premier of Nova Scotia – George Henry Murray 
Premier of Ontario – George William Ross    
Premier of Prince Edward Island – Donald Farquharson 
Premier of Quebec – Félix-Gabriel Marchand (until October 8) then Simon-Napoléon Parent

Territorial governments

Commissioners 
 Commissioner of Yukon – William Ogilvie

Lieutenant governors 
 Lieutenant Governor of Keewatin – James Colebrooke Patterson (until October 10) then Daniel Hunter McMillan
 Lieutenant Governor of the North-West Territories – Amédée E. Forget

Premiers 
 Premier of North-West Territories – Frederick Haultain

Events

January to June
 January 8 – Hugh John Macdonald becomes premier of Manitoba, replacing Thomas Greenway.
 February 18 – February 27 – Boer War: The Royal Canadian Regiment of Infantry plays a decisive role in the Battle of Paardeberg.
 February 27 – Charles Semlin is dismissed as premier of British Columbia.
 February 28 – Joseph Martin becomes premier of British Columbia.
 March 16 – Boer War: Strathcona's Horse leave for South Africa.

 April 26 – Two-thirds of Hull, Quebec, is destroyed in a fire.
 June 15 – James Dunsmuir becomes premier of British Columbia, replacing Joseph Martin.

July to December
 August 31 – Lemuel John Tweedie becomes premier of New Brunswick, replacing Henry Emmerson.
 September 25 – Félix-Gabriel Marchand, Premier of Quebec, dies in office.
 October 8 – Simon-Napoléon Parent becomes premier of Quebec.
 October 29 – Sir Rodmond Roblin becomes premier of Manitoba, replacing Hugh John Macdonald.
 November 7 
 Federal election: Sir Wilfrid Laurier's Liberals win a second consecutive majority.
 Boer War: The Battle of Leliefontein begins. Three Canadians receive the Victoria Cross for their valour in the engagement.
 December 6 – Alphonse Desjardins founds Mouvement Desjardins, the first credit union in North America.

Full date unknown
 -The federal government doubles the head tax on Chinese immigrants
 -The Canadian Tuberculosis Association meets for the first time

Births

January to June
 January 1 – Sam Berger, lawyer, businessman and football player  (d.1992)
 January 8 – Solon Earl Low, politician (d.1962)
 February 20 – Graham Spry, broadcasting pioneer, business executive, diplomat and socialist (d.1983)
 March 12 – David Croll, politician (d.1991)
 April 19 – Roland Michener, lawyer, politician, diplomat and Governor-General of Canada (d.1991)
 April 30 – David Manners, actor (d.1998)
 May 25 – Alain Grandbois, poet (d.1975)

 May 25 – Malcolm Norris, Métis leader (d.1967)
 May 29 – Antonio Talbot, politician (d.1980)
 June 3 – Gordon Sinclair, journalist, writer and commentator (d.1984)
 June 21 – Edward S. Rogers, Sr., inventor and radio pioneer (d.1939)
 July 23 – John Babcock, Canada's last surviving World War I veteran (d.2010)

July to December
 August 13 – Gordon Sparling, filmmaker (d.1994)
 September 6 – W. A. C. Bennett, Premier of British Columbia (d.1979)
 November 20 – Athole Shearer, actress (d.1985)

Full date unknown
 Harry Cassidy, academic, social reformer and civil servant (d.1951)

Deaths
 February 25 – Benjamin Pâquet, Roman Catholic priest and educationist (b.1832)
 March 1 – Frederick Carter, Premier of Newfoundland (b.1819)
 March 20 – George Hope Bertram, politician (b. 1847)
 August 4 – Marc-Aurèle Plamondon, lawyer, journalist, publisher, and judge (b.1823)
 August 11 – Georges-Isidore Barthe, lawyer, publisher, journalist and politician (b.1834)
 September 25 – Félix-Gabriel Marchand, journalist, author, notary, politician and 11th Premier of Quebec (b.1832)
 December 21 – Désiré Olivier Bourbeau, politician and merchant (b.1834)

Historical documents
Political cartoonist shows Canadian farmer's preference for Liberal over Conservative record

After spreading fire destroys Ottawa power plant, House forced to adjourn as governments seek help from military and nearby cities

Fire that destroyed much of Hull (Gatineau), Quebec, and part of Ottawa described

Hartley Bay girl describes her time in Kitimat, B.C. boarding school

Newspaper publishers' problems with costs and paper supply

Cape Town thanks Imperial volunteer forces for their South African War service

Saint John, New Brunswick program includes two women's military drill teams

Whitefish, spuds and Klondikers: the news from Lesser Slave Lake, N.W.T.

References 

 
Years of the 19th century in Canada
Canada
1900 in North America